Mesomphix is a genus of terrestrial gastropods belonging to the family Gastrodontidae. 

The species of this genus are found in Europe, North America, and New Zealand.

Species
 Mesomphix andrewsae (Pilsbry, 1895) 
 Mesomphix anurus Hubricht, 1962 
 Mesomphix bilineatus (L. Pfeiffer, 1846)
 Mesomphix capnodes (W.G. Binney, 1857)
 Mesomphix cupreus (Rafinesque, 1831)
 Mesomphix euryomphala (L. Pfeiffer, 1845)
 Mesomphix flora (L. Pfeiffer, 1850)
 Mesomphix friabilis (W.G. Binney, 1857)
 Mesomphix globosus (MacMillan, 1940)
 Mesomphix inornatus (Say, 1822)
 Mesomphix latior (Pilsbry, 1900)
 Mesomphix lucubratus (Say, 1829)
 Mesomphix luisant Dourson, 2015
 Mesomphix martensianus (Pilsbry, 1903)
 Mesomphix modestus (E. von Martens, 1892)
 Mesomphix paradensis (L. Pfeiffer, 1860)
 Mesomphix perfragilis (Wetherby, 1894)
 Mesomphix perlaevis (Pilsbry, 1900)
 Mesomphix pilsbryi (Clapp, 1904)
 Mesomphix pittieri (Bartsch, 1909)
 Mesomphix ptychoraphe (Weinland & Martens, 1859)
 Mesomphix rugeli (W.G. Binney, 1879)
 Mesomphix subplanus (A. Binney, 1842)
 Mesomphix tuxtlensis (Crosse & P. Fischer, 1870)
 Mesomphix vulgatus H. B. Baker, 1933
 Mesomphix zonites (L. Pfeiffer, 1845)
Species brought into synonymy
 Mesomphix derochetus Hubricht, 1962: synonym of Mesomphix vulgatus H. B. Baker, 1933
 Mesomphix ruidus Hubricht, 1958: synonym of Mesomphix globosus (MacMillan, 1940)

References

 Bank, R. A. (2017). Classification of the Recent terrestrial Gastropoda of the World. Last update: July 16th, 2017.

External links
 Rafinesque C.S. (1819). Prodrome. De 70 nouveaux genres d'animaux découverts dans l'intérieur des Etats-Unis d'Amérique, durant l'année 1818. Journal de Physique, de Chimie, d'Histoire Naturelle et des Arts. 88: 417-429
 Rafinesque C.S. (1831). Enumeration and account of some remarkable natural objects of the cabinet of Prof. Rafinesque, in Philadelphia; being animals, shells, plants, fossils, collected by him in North America between 1816 and 183. Philadelphia. 8 pp
 Iredale, T. (1933). Systematic notes on Australian land shells. Records of the Australian Museum. 19(1): 37-59

Gastrodontidae
Gastropod genera